Graham Harvey (born 25 August 1959) is an English religious studies scholar. He specialises in modern Paganism, indigenous religions and animism.

Life and work
Graham Harvey was born in 1959. He obtained a Ph.D. title at the University of Newcastle upon Tyne in 1991 on a dissertation about group identity in ancient Jewish literature. From 1991 to 1995 he taught religious studies in Newcastle. From 1996 to 2003 he worked as reader and principal lecturer in religious studies at the King Alfred's College, Winchester. Since 2003 he works at the Open University where he is a professor and was head of the religious studies department from 2013 to 2017.

After being invited to do a presentation about contemporary druids, Harvey began to do fieldwork about modern Paganism which resulted in several books, notably Listening People, Speaking Earth: Contemporary Paganism (1997) and Researching Paganisms (2004). He has written extensively about indigenous religions and animism, producing the monograph Animism: Respecting the Living World (2005) and the edited volume The Handbook of Contemporary Animism (2013). In the monograph Food, Sex & Strangers: Understanding Religion as Everyday Life (2013) he seeks to define religion through people's behaviours and everyday practices rather than belief.

Harvey practices modern Paganism with druid orders and as animism with ecological activists. He is married and also participates in Jewish celebrations with his wife.

Selected publications
Monographs
 The True Israel: Uses of the Names Jew, Hebrew and Israel in Ancient Jewish and Early Christian Literature, Brill, 1996
 Listening People, Speaking Earth: Contemporary Paganism, Hurst, 1997
 Animism: Respecting the Living World, Hurst, 2005
 What do Pagans Believe?, Granta, 2007
 Food, Sex and Strangers: Understanding Religion as Everyday Life, Routledge, 2013

Edited volumes
 Words Remembered, Texts Renewed: Festschrift for Prof John F.A. Sawyer, with Jon Davies and Wilfred G. E. Watson, Sheffield Academic Press, 1995
 Paganism Today: Witches, Druids, the Goddess and Ancient Earth Traditions for the Twenty-First Century, with Charlotte Hardman, Thorsons, 1996
 Indigenous Religions: A Companion, Cassell, 2000
 Law and Religion in Contemporary Society: Communities, Individualism and the State, with Peter W. Edge, Ashgate, 2000
 Indigenous religious musics, with Karen Ralls-MacLeod, Ashgate, 2000
 Shamanism: A Reader, Routledge, 2003
 Historical Dictionary of Shamanism, with Robert Wallis, Scarecrow, 2004
 Researching Paganisms, with Jenny Blain and Douglas Ezzy, AltaMira, 2004
 The Paganism Reader, with Chas S. Clifton, Routledge, 2004
 Ritual and Religious Belief: a reader, Equinox, 2005
 Indigenous diasporas and dislocations, with Charles D. Thompson Jr, Ashgate, 2005
 Religions in Focus: New Approaches to Tradition and Contemporary Practices, Equinox, 2009
 Handbook of Contemporary Animism, Acumen, 2013
 Edward Burnett Tylor, Religion and Culture, with Paul-François Tremlett and Liam T. Sutherland, Bloomsbury, 2017
 Sensual Religion: Religion and the Five Senses, with Jessica Hughes, Equinox, 2018
 Indigenizing Movements in Europe, Equinox, 2020
 Reassembling Democracy: Ritual and Cultural Resource, with Michael Houseman, Sarah M. Pike and Jone Salomonsen, Bloomsbury, 2020

References

1959 births
Living people
Pagan studies scholars
Alumni of Newcastle University
Academics of the Open University
English modern pagans
Modern pagan writers